The discography of Queens of the Stone Age, an American rock band, consists of seven studio albums, one live album, three extended plays, fourteen singles, three promotional singles and twenty music videos.

Queens of the Stone Age (also known as QOTSA) was formed in 1996 by guitarist and vocalist Josh Homme (formerly of Kyuss) under the name Gamma Ray. The band signed with the independent label Loosegroove Records and released the Kyuss/Queens of the Stone Age extended play in 1997. In 1998, the band released its full-length debut, Queens of the Stone Age. The band subsequently signed with Interscope Records and released its first album for a major label, Rated R, which became the first Queens of the Stone Age album to chart.

In 2001, the band was joined by vocalist Mark Lanegan, and released their third album, Songs for the Deaf in 2002. The album brought the band to a new level of commercial success, and a full-fledged tour followed in support of the album. Queens of the Stone Age released a follow-up album, Lullabies to Paralyze, in 2005. The album peaked at number five on the Billboard 200, selling 97,000 copies during its first week. Two years later, the band released its fifth studio album, Era Vulgaris, which debuted and peaked at number fourteen on the Billboard 200.

After a four-year hiatus, Queens of the Stone Age released ...Like Clockwork on June 4, 2013, and four more years later saw the release of Villains on August 25, 2017.

Albums

Studio albums

Live albums

Extended plays

Live extended plays

Singles

Promotional singles

Other singles

Other charted songs

Other appearances

Music videos

Notes

References

External links
 Official website
 Queens of the Stone Age at AllMusic
 

Discography
Rock music group discographies
Discographies of American artists